Anthony John Bemboom (born January 18, 1990) is an American professional baseball catcher in the Baltimore Orioles organization. He has previously played in MLB for the Tampa Bay Rays and Los Angeles Angels.

Career

Early career
Bemboom graduated from Sauk Rapids-Rice High School in Sauk Rapids, Minnesota. He attended Iowa Western Community College in Council Bluffs, Iowa, from 2009 through 2010. He attended Creighton University in Omaha, Nebraska, from 2011 through 2012.

The Los Angeles Angels selected Bemboom in the 22nd round, with the 687th overall selection, of the 2012 MLB draft. He signed with the Angels and played in Minor League Baseball for their organization from 2012 through 2016. During his time with them, he played for the AZL Angels, Orem Owlz, Burlington Bees, Inland Empire 66ers, Arkansas Travelers, and the Salt Lake Bees.

Bemboom was selected by the Colorado Rockies in the minor league portion of the 2016 Rule 5 draft. He played for the Albuquerque Isotopes in 2017 and 2018.

Tampa Bay Rays
Bemboom signed a minor league contract with the Tampa Bay Rays on November 26, 2018. He began the 2019 season playing for the Charlotte Stone Crabs and the Durham Bulls. The Rays promoted Bemboom to the major leagues on May 10, 2019. He made his major league debut on May 12 versus the New York Yankees.  Bemboom got his first career hit on May 14, 2019, an RBI double versus the Miami Marlins. He later exited the game with a knee injury. He was placed on the injured list on May 16. On July 15, he was reinstated from the injured list and designated for assignment.

Los Angeles Angels
On July 15, 2019, Bemboom was traded to the Los Angeles Angels in exchange for cash considerations. On August 24, 2020, Bemboom made his first career pitching appearance against the Houston Astros, pitching a scoreless inning after getting Carlos Correa, Taylor Jones and Michael Brantley to fly out following the walk of Kyle Tucker. In 2020, Bemboom batted .208/.328/.417 with 3 home runs and led all Angels catchers with a 41% caught stealing rate. On August 7, 2021, Bemboom was designated for assignment by the Angels.

Los Angeles Dodgers
On August 9, 2021, the Los Angeles Dodgers claimed Bemboom off waivers from the Angels. On August 14, Bemboom was outrighted off of the 40-man roster without having appeared in a game for the Dodgers. He played in 25 games for the Triple-A Oklahoma City Dodgers, with a .189 batting average. Bemboom became a free agent following the season.

Baltimore Orioles
On December 16, 2021, Bemboom signed a minor league contract with the Baltimore Orioles. He made the Orioles' Opening Day roster for the 2022 season. He was designated for assignment on May 21, 2022. He cleared waivers and was sent outright to Triple-A Norfolk Tides on May 27.

See also
Rule 5 draft results

References

External links

Living people
1990 births
People from Sauk Rapids, Minnesota
Baseball players from Minnesota
Major League Baseball catchers
Tampa Bay Rays players
Los Angeles Angels players
Baltimore Orioles players
Iowa Western Reivers baseball players
Creighton Bluejays baseball players
Arizona League Angels players
Orem Owlz players
Burlington Bees players
Inland Empire 66ers of San Bernardino players
Arkansas Travelers players
Salt Lake Bees players
Albuquerque Isotopes players
Charlotte Stone Crabs players
Durham Bulls players
Estrellas Orientales players
Tigres del Licey players
American expatriate baseball players in the Dominican Republic
Oklahoma City Dodgers players
Norfolk Tides players